Robert Bell (born 30 April 1979 in Newcastle upon Tyne) is a British professional racing driver. He has competed in such series as the FIA GT Championship, the British GT Championship and Formula Renault V6 Eurocup, and is best known as the winner of the 2016 Blancpain Endurance Series with Shane van Gisbergen and Côme Ledogar. He has also won the Winter Series of Formula Renault UK in both 2001 and 2002.

Bell was the Le Mans Series GT2 class champion for Virgo Motorsport in the 2007 and 2008 seasons, and vice-champion for JMW in 2009 and 2011. In 2009 he also finished 7th at the FIA GT Championship GT2 class for CRS Racing, collecting a 2nd place at the 24 Hours of Spa. Since 2012, Bell has competed at the Blancpain Endurance Series Pro Cup class with a McLaren MP4-12C for Gulf Racing UK.

Bell also finished 2nd in the GT class at the 2011 24 Hours of Daytona as a Paul Miller Racing driver. He returned to the team for the 2012 12 Hours of Sebring, resulting 5th in the GT class.

Bell competed in the 2019 British GT alongside Shaun Balfe in a McLaren 720S GT3. He finished third in the GT3 standings after winning at the final round at Donington Park.

His brother Matt also races Internationally in GT3 and LM prototypes.

Racing record

24 Hours of Le Mans results

Complete FIA World Endurance Championship results

Complete WeatherTech SportsCar Championship results
(key) (Races in bold indicate pole position)

Complete FIA GT Series results

‡ — Guest driver – Not eligible for points.

Complete British GT Championship results
(key) (Races in bold indicate pole position) (Races in italics indicate fastest lap)

† Not eligible for points.

Complete Asian Le Mans Series results
(key) (Races in bold indicate pole position) (Races in italics indicate fastest lap)

References

External links
 
 

1979 births
Living people
English racing drivers
People from Newcastle upon Tyne (district)
Sportspeople from Tyne and Wear
Formula Ford drivers
British Formula Renault 2.0 drivers
Formula Renault V6 Eurocup drivers
24 Hours of Le Mans drivers
FIA GT Championship drivers
American Le Mans Series drivers
European Le Mans Series drivers
24 Hours of Daytona drivers
Rolex Sports Car Series drivers
Blancpain Endurance Series drivers
FIA World Endurance Championship drivers
ADAC GT Masters drivers
WeatherTech SportsCar Championship drivers
24 Hours of Spa drivers
Asian Le Mans Series drivers
International GT Open drivers
British GT Championship drivers
Motaworld Racing drivers
Aston Martin Racing drivers
David Price Racing drivers

Extreme Speed Motorsports drivers
CRS Racing drivers
Teo Martín Motorsport drivers
Strakka Racing drivers
United Autosports drivers
Jota Sport drivers
Ecurie Ecosse drivers
McLaren Racing drivers
Boutsen Ginion Racing drivers